The N&W LC-1 was a class of boxcab electric locomotives built by Baldwin-Westinghouse for the Norfolk and Western Railway. The locomotives were part of an electrification project undertaken by the N&W to improve traffic conditions on the Elkhorn grade in its Bluefield Division. Baldwin-Westinghouse delivered 12 twin-unit boxcabs in 1914–1915. N&W scrapped them in 1950 when it discontinued electric operations.

Background 

In the early twentieth century the Bluefield Division of the Norfolk and Western Railway featured a forbidding two percent average grade. Multiple 2-6-6-2 Class Z1 "Mallet" articulated steam locomotives labored hauling  coal trains up and down the grade.

Design 

The LC-1 were of the boxcab type and operated in a semi-permanent twin-unit configuration.

The LC-1 collected power from overhead lines via pantograph; an on-board transformer stepped the overhead single-phase 11 kV AC down to 750 V. This in turn powered a rotary phase converter, which converted the single phase current to three phase 750 V. The use of three-phase aboard the LC-1 was recommended by Gibbs & Hill, a New York firm who consulted with N&W on the electrification project. According to William D. Middleton, Gibbs & Hill believed that the "ruggedness and simplicity, high output, uniform torque, and adaptability" of three-phase made it a superior choice to single-phase AC or DC for the mountainous Elkhorn area.

History 
The effect of the electric operation was immediate and measurable. In June 1914 the electrified district handled 272 trains averaging  of coal. Each train required three Class Z1 locomotives. In June 1915, with electric operation only partially implemented, this rose to 397 trains averaging , a 60 percent increase. In normal operation two LC-1 boxcabs could handle each train.

After World War II the N&W bypassed the existing Elkhorn Tunnel with a new tunnel twice as long as the original, double-tracked, and on a gentler 1.4% grade. These improvements eliminated the need for electrification. On the opening of the new tunnel on June 26, 1950 the N&W retired the LC-1s. None have been saved.

Notes

References

External links 

 LC-1 at the N&W Historical Society Archives

11 kV AC locomotives
1-B+B-1 locomotives
Electric locomotives of the United States
LC1
Scrapped locomotives
Standard gauge locomotives of the United States
Westinghouse locomotives